The following lists events that happened during 1968 in South Africa.

Incumbents
 State President:
 Tom Naudé (acting until 9 April).
 Jim Fouché (from 10 April).
 Prime Minister: John Vorster.
 Chief Justice: Lucas Cornelius Steyn.

Events

January
 1 – Magnus Malan is appointed as Officer Commanding of the Military Academy in Saldanha.

April
 10 – Jacobus Johannes Fouché becomes the 3rd State President of South Africa.
 20 – A South African Airways Boeing 707 crashes after take-off from Windhoek, killing 122 of the 129 on board.
 30 – The bill establishing five universities for Blacks comes into force.

Unknown date
 The Liberal Party of South Africa is banned by the government.
 Dorothy Nyembe is arrested for the second time and charged under the Suppression of Communism Act.
 In the Villa Peri campaign, the Azanian People's Liberation Army tries to infiltrate members into South Africa via Botswana and Mozambique.
 The South African Bureau of State Security is formed independently of the South African Police, accountable to the Prime Minister.

Births
 22 February – Camilla Waldman, actress
 29 February – Suanne Braun, actress
 5 March – Lindani Nkosi, actor
 28 April – Andy Flower, Zimbabwean cricketer
 17 May – Mickey Arthur, cricket player and coach
 30 June – Rebecca Malope, gospel singer & TV host
 4 September – Daniel Mudau, football player
 16 September – Loren Wulfsohn, synchronized swimmer
 23 September – Zane Moosa, football player
 25 December – Andrew Tucker, football player

Deaths
 7 January – J.L.B. Smith, ichthyologist (b. 1897).
 10 January – Eben Dönges, politician and elected State President (b. 1898).
 21 June 21 – Constance Georgina Tardrew, South African botanist (b. 1883).

Railways

Locomotives
 In July, the South African Railways places the first of 115 Class 33-400 General Electric type U20C diesel-electric locomotives in service in South West Africa.

Sports
 17 September – The Marylebone Cricket Club tour of South Africa is cancelled when South Africa refuses to accept the presence of Basil D'Oliveira in the side.

References

South Africa
Years in South Africa
History of South Africa